Opacities is the fourth EP by British progressive metal band SikTh. The EP is the band's first release since reforming in 2014. Opacities was self–released by the band on 4 December 2015.

Background and recording
SikTh reformed in 2014 and played at Download Festival followed by a UK tour. The band announced they would begin recording a new album in summer 2015 with a release scheduled sometime in November/December. The album was crowd funded via PledgeMusic and was recorded without the assistance of a record label.

Release and promotion
In promotion of Opacities a music video for the song "Philistine Philosophies" was released on 2 November 2015. The album became available for streaming via The Independent a month later on 2 December. Opacities was released on 4 December. SikTh played five shows with Slipknot in support of the EP.

Track listing

Personnel
SikTh
 Mikee Goodman – vocals
 Justin Hill – vocals
 Dan Weller – lead guitar
 Graham "Pin" Pinney – rhythm guitar
 James Leach – bass
 Dan "Loord" Foord – drums, percussion

Additional personnel
 Abi Fry – viola on "Days Are Dreamed"

References

2015 EPs
Sikth albums
Self-released EPs